An annular solar eclipse occurred at the Moon’s descending node of the orbit on Thursday, December 26, 2019. A solar eclipse occurs when the Moon passes between Earth and the Sun, thereby totally or partly obscuring the Sun for a viewer on Earth. An annular solar eclipse occurs when the Moon's apparent diameter is smaller than the Sun's, blocking most of the Sun's light and causing the Sun to look like an annulus (ring). An annular eclipse appears as a partial eclipse over a region of the Earth thousands of kilometres wide.

The annularity was visible in Saudi Arabia, Qatar, Kuwait, United Arab Emirates, Oman, Pakistan, Sri Lanka, Bangladesh, Malaysia, Indonesia, Singapore, Northern Mariana Islands, and Guam.

Details

Visibility and viewing

It was the last solar eclipse of 2019. The central path of the 2019 annular eclipse passed through the Saudi Arabian peninsula, southern India, Sumatra, Borneo, Philippines and Guam. A partial eclipse was visible thousands of kilometers wide from the central path. It covered small parts of Eastern Europe, much of Asia, North and West Australia, Eastern Africa, the Pacific Ocean and the Indian Ocean. The eclipse started with an antumbra having a magnitude of 0.96; it stretched 164 kilometers wide, and traveled eastwards at an average rate of 1.1 kilometers per second. The longest duration of annularity was 3 minutes and 40 seconds, at 5.30 UT1 occurring in the South China Sea (0°45'54.0"N 105°29'06.0"E).

The eclipse began in Saudi Arabia about 220 kilometers northeast of Riyadh at 03:43 UT1 and ended in Guam at 06:59.4 UT1. It reached India near Kannur, Kerala, at 03:56 UT1. The shadow reached the southeast coast of India at 04:04 UT1. Traveling through northern Sri Lanka, it headed into the Bay of Bengal. The next main visible places were Palau (Malaysia), Sumatra and Singapore. It then passed through the South China Sea, crossed Borneo and the Celebes Sea, the Philippines archipelago and then headed towards the western Pacific. The antumbral shadow encountered Guam at 6:56 UT1 and rose back into space.

Gallery

Related eclipses

Eclipses of 2019 
 A partial solar eclipse on January 6.
 A total lunar eclipse on January 21.
 A total solar eclipse on July 2.
 A partial lunar eclipse on July 16.
 An annular solar eclipse on December 26.
Astronomers Without Borders collected eclipse glasses for redistribution to Latin America and Asia for their 2019 eclipses from the Solar eclipse of August 21, 2017.

Tzolkinex 
 Preceded: Solar eclipse of November 13, 2012
 Followed: Solar eclipse of February 6, 2027

Half-Saros cycle 
 Preceded: Lunar eclipse of December 21, 2010
 Followed: Lunar eclipse of December 31, 2028

Tritos 
 Preceded: Solar eclipse of January 26, 2009
 Followed: Solar eclipse of November 25, 2030

Solar Saros 132 
 Preceded: Solar eclipse of December 14, 2001
 Followed: Solar eclipse of January 5, 2038

Inex 
 Preceded: Solar eclipse of January 15, 1991
 Followed: Solar eclipse of December 5, 2048

Triad 
 Preceded: Solar eclipse of February 24, 1933
 Followed: Solar eclipse of October 26, 2106

Solar eclipses 2018–2021

Saros 132

Metonic series

Notes

References

 Eclipseportal.com Annular Solar Eclipse 2019
 CIMSS Satellite Blog: Annular solar eclipse shadow 
 solar-eclipse.de: The total solar eclipse of 12/26/2019
 CESSI Prediction of 26 December 2019 Solar Eclipse

2019 12 26
2019 in science
2019 12 26
December 2019 events
2019 in Sri Lanka